MTV Ao Vivo is the first live album by Skank, recorded in Ouro Preto and released in 2001. The album sold 600,000 copies.

It contains a Spanish version for The Police's "Wrapped Around Your Finger" and a new song "Acima do Sol".

Track listing

Album

Video 
The DVD contains the full concert, as well as the band interviews.

Bonus features 
 Band Interviews
 Song Commentaries
 Discography
 Photo Gallery

Personnel
Samuel Rosa - lead vocals, acoustic and electric guitar
Henrique Portugal - keyboards, acoustic guitar, backing vocals
Lelo Zanetti - bass guitar, backing vocals
Haroldo Ferretti - drums
Jorge Continentino – saxophone
Paulo Márcio – trumpet
Wagner Mayer – trombone
Ramiro Musotto – percussion
Chico Amaral – acoustic guitar

Production
Producers: Skank and Liminha
Executive producer: Fernando Furtado
Recording technician: Roberto Marques
Mastering technician: Ricardo Garcia
Project coordination: Bruno Batista 
Art supervision: Carla Framback
A&R: Ronaldo Viana
Photography: Marcos Hermes
DVD Director: Joana Mazzucchelli
Digital editing: Renato Cipriano, Bruno Ferretti

References
Discos do Brasil 

Skank (band) albums
2001 live albums